Hatfield Cemetery is a historic cemetery located near Sarah Ann, Logan County, West Virginia. The earliest burial dates to 1898, and is the grave of Captain S. Hatfield (1891–1898). The cemetery features the grave and monument with a life-size statue of Captain Anderson "Devil Anse" Hatfield, erected in 1926.  It is notable as a burial place for members of the Hatfield family, early settlers of the region and participants in the famous Hatfield-McCoy feud during the 19th century.  It is a companion to the Hatfield Cemetery near Newtown, West Virginia.

It was listed on the National Register of Historic Places in 1980.

References

External links
 

1898 establishments in West Virginia
Buildings and structures in Logan County, West Virginia
Cemeteries on the National Register of Historic Places in West Virginia
Hatfield family
National Register of Historic Places in Logan County, West Virginia